Barry & Fran Weissler are Tony Award-winning, (for revivals) American theatrical producers.

Career
Barry Weissler (born 1939), a Rutgers Law School drop-out, and Fran Weissler (born 1928) a New York University drama major,  met in 1964 during an engagement of a touring theatrical production in New Jersey. Both worked in retailing. In 1970, they formed National Artists Management Company to present classic plays to  children, elementary schools, High School, College and adult audiences with professional casts. After years of touring Shakespearean plays on the east coast they brought Othello and Medea to Broadway in 1982.  The two plays earned them their first two Tony Award nominations. As of 2014 the pair have earned 28 Tony or Drama Desk nominations. They have won 7 Tony Awards and 4 Drama Desk Awards. The couple also received the Olivier Award for Outstanding Musical Production for their production of Chicago in the London West End.

Honours
In 2010, Barry & Fran Weissler received the New York Musical Theatre Festival's lifetime achievement award. In 2014, Barry & Fran Weissler received the PlayhouseSquare's "Star Award for achievement in the Performing Arts".

Awards and nominations
The Weisslers have been nominated for many Tony Awards, Drama Desk Awards, and Olivier Awards.

2016 Waitress (musical) - Tony Award for Best Musical - nominee
2014 Violet - Tony Award - nominee
2014 Violet - Drama Desk Award - nominee
2013 Pippin - Tony Award - winner
2013 Pippin - Drama Desk Award - winner
2011 The Scottsboro Boys - Tony Award for Best Musical - nominee
2010 La Cage aux Folles - Tony Award - winner
2010 La Cage aux Folles - Drama Desk Award - winner
2010 Promises, Promises - Drama Desk Award - nominee
2005 Sweet Charity - Tony Award - nominee
2005 Sweet Charity - Drama Desk Award - nominee
2004 Wonderful Town - Tony Award - nominee
2004 Wonderful Town - Drama Desk Award - nominee
1999 Annie Get Your Gun - Tony Award - winner
1999 Annie Get Your Gun - Drama Desk Award - nominee
1997 Chicago - Tony Award - winner
1997 Chicago - Olivier Award for Best Revival of a Musical - winner
1997 Chicago - Drama Desk Award - winner
1994 Grease - Tony Award - nominee
1994 My Fair Lady - Drama Desk Award - nominee
1992 Falsettos - Tony Award for Best Musical - nominee
1992 Falsettos - Drama Desk Award - nominee
1991 Fiddler on the Roof - Tony Award for Best Revival - winner
1990 Gypsy - Tony Award for Best Revival - winner
1990 Gypsy - Drama Desk Award - winner
1990 Cat on a Hot Tin Roof - Drama Desk Award for Outstanding Revival - nominee
1988 Cabaret - Tony Award - nominee
1988 Cabaret - Drama Desk Award - nominee
1982 Othello - Tony Award for Reproduction (Play or Musical) - winner
1982 Medea - Tony Award for Reproduction (Play or Musical) - nominee

Notable Productions

Violet - Apr 20, 2014 - Aug 10, 2014
Pippin - Apr 25, 2013 - Jan 04, 2015
The Scottsboro Boys - Oct 31, 2010 - Dec 12, 2010
Enron - Apr 27, 2010 - May 9, 2010
Promises, Promises - Apr 25, 2010 - Jan 02, 2011
La Cage aux Folles - Apr 18, 2010 - May 1, 2011
Come Fly Away - Mar 25, 2010 - Sep 05, 2010
Sweet Charity - May 4, 2005 - Dec 31, 2005
Wonderful Town - Nov 23, 2003 - Jan 30, 2005
Seussical - Nov 30, 2000 - May 20, 2001
Annie Get Your Gun - Mar 04, 1999 - Sep 01, 2001
Chicago on Broadway - Nov 14, 1996 – Present
Chicago in London - November 18, 1997 – Present
My Thing Of Love - May 3, 1995 - May 14, 1995
Grease - May 11, 1994 - Jan 25, 1998
My Fair Lady - Dec 09, 1993 - May 1, 1994
Falsettos - Apr 29, 1992 - Jun 27, 1993
Fiddler on the Roof - Nov 18, 1990 - Jun 16, 1991
Cat on a Hot Tin Roof - Mar 21, 1990 - Aug 01, 1990
Gypsy - Nov 16, 1989 - Jul 28, 1991
Macbeth - Apr 21, 1988 - Jun 26, 1988
Cabaret - Oct 22, 1987 - Jun 04, 1988
André De Shields's Haarlem Nocturne - Nov 18, 1984 - Dec 30, 1984
Zorba - Oct 16, 1983 - Sep 02, 1984
Your Arms Too Short to Box with God - Sep 09, 1982 - Nov 07, 1982
Medea - May 2, 1982 - Jun 27, 1982
Othello - Feb 03, 1982 - May 23, 1982

References

External links
 
 Barry Weissler- Columbia Business School
 National Artists Management Co.
 https://www.ibdb.com/broadway-organization/national-artists-management-company-78841
 https://www.playbill.com/person/barry-fran-weissler-vault-0000114936
 National Artists Management Co., Inc. v. Susan Weaving and Richard Martini, 769 F. Supp. 1224 (S.D.N.Y. 1991)
 

American theatre directors
Women theatre directors
American theatre managers and producers
American entertainment industry businesspeople
People from New Jersey
Tony Award winners